The Chiltern Hundreds (released in the U.S. as The Amazing Mr. Beecham) is a 1949 British politically-themed comedy film directed by John Paddy Carstairs, adapting William Douglas Home's 1947 play of the same name and starring Lana Morris, David Tomlinson and Cecil Parker.

Synopsis

Viscount Pym (David Tomlinson) – whilst on National Service – gets leave from the British Army on the pretext of standing for Parliament as a Conservative Party candidate in his home constituency, held by his family for generations.  The request is a ruse to enable Pym to marry his wealthy American fiancée June Farrell (Helen Backlin) while she is still in England and before she has to return home to America.  His master plan backfires when he finds himself swept into the election campaign and beaten by the more politically experienced Mr Cleghorn (Tom Macaulay), the Labour Party candidate.

After losing the election, his family take the news calmly, but his fiancée is mortified, and he must now devise a plan to win her back.  When Cleghorn is made a peer, Viscount Pym stands again for the newly vacant seat, however this time he fights the campaign as a Socialist candidate but is beaten once again, this time by the family butler Beecham (Cecil Parker) – a steadfast Conservative.

(The title of the original play and the British title of this film refers to a Parliamentary convention which applies when a Member of Parliament wishes to stand down. Since MPs cannot technically resign, they apply for the Chiltern Hundreds instead, which is an 'office of profit under the Crown'.)

Cast

Production
The film was made for £109,000. Anthony Steel has one of his earliest roles in the film.

Critical reception
Bosley Crowther in The New York Times noted "a somewhat slapdash lot of fooling. It rambles all over the place and is perilously uneven in its humorous attack. But it does offer several stinging sideswipes at the "plutocrats, peers and parasites," and kids class distinctions and traditions in a pleasantly good-natured way. In the title role of the butler, Cecil Parker—he who played the pompous colonel in the last episode of "Quartet"—is delightfully foolish and mannered, but A. E. Matthews as the butler's ranking boss, a beautifully addle-brained old codger, runs away with the show. Mr. Matthews' illustration of the complacence of an impoverished earl may not be wholly consistent but it glistens brightly in spots. David Tomlinson also does nicely as the thoroughly light-weight young lord and Lana Morris, Tom Macaulay and Marjorie Fielding are amusing in other roles."

References

External links
 

1949 films
British political comedy films
1949 romantic comedy films
1940s political comedy films
British romantic comedy films
British films based on plays
British black-and-white films
Films scored by Benjamin Frankel
Films with screenplays by Patrick Kirwan
Films directed by John Paddy Carstairs
Films about elections
1940s English-language films
1940s British films